Ivan Martynovich Lesovoy (22 November 1835 – ?) was a Russian Imperial Army general who fought in the Russo-Turkish War and served as the Minister of War of the Principality of Bulgaria.

Biography 
Ivan Lesovoy joined the Russian Imperial Army on 20 July 1857. After the Russo-Turkish War, he commanded the artillery of the Bulgarian Land Forces. In 1882 Lesovoy became the acting war minister of Bulgaria and the general-adjutant of the Prince of Bulgaria. Later that year he returned to Russia. From 1885 to 1893, Lesovoy was in command of the 39th Artillery Brigade of the 39th Infantry Division.

Rank history 
Ensign (1.10.1858)
Junior Lieutenant (14.09.1860)
Guards Ensign (30.07.1862)
Guards Junior Lieutenant (30.08.1862)
Guards Lieutenant (4.10.1863)
Guards Staff Captain (16.04.1867)
Guards Captain (30.08.1870)
Guards Colonel (31.03.1874)
Major General (21.04.1881)

Awards 
Order of St. George (4th class)

References 

1835 births
Imperial Russian Army generals
Russian military personnel of the Russo-Turkish War (1877–1878)
Year of death missing
Defence ministers of Bulgaria